The Israel Defense Forces 877th Judea and Samaria Division (also known as the West Bank Division) is a regional division in the Israeli Central Command. It is responsible for Israeli military activity in the Judea and Samaria Area, presently under Israeli-occupation. The current commander of the division is Brigadier General Yaniv Alaluf, who was appointed to the position in September 2019.

Mission
The division was established in 1988 after the outbreak of the First Intifadah. The division serves as a command level for all IDF forces in the West Bank, and as a results is engaged in an ongoing fight against Palestinian political violence within the Palestinian National Authority-administered territory, as well as against attempts by Palestinian militants to infiltrate Israel to commit suicide attacks.

The division is responsible for the seven Palestinian cities of Jenin, Tulkarm, Qalqilya, Nablus, Ramallah, Bethlehem, and Hebron.

The formal tasks of the division include confronting Palestinian political violence, confronting disturbances of law and order by Palestinians, securing transportation routes in the region, and defending Israeli settlements.

Activities
The division carries out various actions and arrests of Palestinian militants on a daily basis. This active level of operations often relies on the sayarot (Israeli special forces), units from the Central Command, the Duvdevan unit, and the Israel Border Police's Yamam.

The division's headquarters are located in the vicinity of Beit El, north of Ramallah.

Units
 877th "Judea and Samaria" Division
 Menashe Territorial Brigade around Jenin
 Ephraim Territorial Brigade around Tulkarm and Qalqilyah
 Samaria Territorial Brigade around Nablus
 Binyamin Territorial Brigade around Ramallah
 Etzion Territorial Brigade around Bethlehem
 Yehuda Territorial Brigade around Hebron
 Division Signal Battalion "Ofek"
 636th "Nitzan/Bud" Field Intelligence Battalion
 "Erez" Military Police Battalion
 "Ta’oz" Military Police Battalion
 "Hatuley HaBar/Wild Cats" Heavy Engineer Company

The division also oversees the West Bank forces of the Israel Border Police, including the Yamas Unit, a special forces unit specializing in operating within the Palestinian population.

See also
Gaza Division
West Bank Closures

References

Divisions of Israel
Israeli occupation of the West Bank
Central Command (Israel)